Patrick "Pat" Lee Ahern (born November 10, 1960) is an American Nordic combined skier. He competed in the 1984 Winter Olympics.

Ahern, who lived in Breckenridge, Colorado, lost an opportunity to win a gold medal “when controversial rulings by the jury canceled two rounds of jumping and wiped out his jumps, two of the longest of the competition.”

He attended University of Alaska Anchorage.

References

1960 births
Living people
Nordic combined skiers at the 1984 Winter Olympics
American male Nordic combined skiers
Olympic Nordic combined skiers of the United States
Sportspeople from Davenport, Iowa
People from Breckenridge, Colorado